The Nagaland Legislative Assembly is the unicameral legislature of the Indian state of Nagaland. Nagaland became a state of India on 1 December 1963 and after election in January 1964, the first Nagaland Legislative Assembly was formed on 11 February 1964. In 1974, the strength of the Nagaland Legislative Assembly was increased to the present strength of 60 members.

There is no nominated member in the House, all the members are elected on the basis of adult franchise from single-seat constituencies. The normal tenure of the House is five years unless dissolved sooner. The seat of the Legislative Assembly is Kohima, the capital of Nagaland.

Members of Legislative Assembly

See also 
List of constituencies of the Nagaland Legislative Assembly

References

Further reading
 Murry, Khochamo Chonzamo (2007). Naga Legislative Assembly and its Speakers, New Delhi: Mittal Publications,

External links
 Nagaland Legislative Assembly, Kohima, webpage

 
State legislatures of India
Nagaland